The Natural Capital Project (NatCap) is a partnership among 250 groups around the world that has developed a systematic approach to weighing nature’s benefits. By placing a value on nature in the context of resource allocation, NatCap is influencing policy, finance and management decisions worldwide.

NatCap is led from a global hub at Stanford University in collaboration with The Nature Conservancy, World Wildlife Fund, the Institute on the Environment of the University of Minnesota, the Stockholm Resilience Centre, and the Chinese Academy of Sciences. It was launched in November 2006.

NatCap engages leaders in governments, corporations, universities and other non-profit organizations, and melds its research with initiatives that benefit both nature and the economy. Nature's value is measured in terms of specific benefits, such as human health, economic development, food security and culture.  While NatCap's approach has garnered broad support, not everyone agrees with the methodology of putting a monetary value on nature.

The Natural Capital Project has developed a free, open-source software tool called InVEST (Integrated Valuation of Ecosystem Services and Trade-offs). It allows farmers, landowners and government officials to make better-informed decisions about the current and future costs of an activity. InVEST is used in more than 185 countries to map and model valuable ecological resources, assess trade-offs in land- and water-use, and integrate both conservation and human development into investments.

References 

Environmental organizations based in the United States